Dennis Joe Reimer (born July 12, 1939) is a retired general of the United States Army, who served as the 33rd Chief of Staff of the Army from June 20, 1995 to June 21, 1999. He is also a graduate of Ranger and Airborne school.

Early life and education
Reimer was born in Enid, Oklahoma on July 12, 1939 and grew up in Medford, Oklahoma. He graduated from the United States Military Academy at West Point and was commissioned into the United States Army as a second lieutenant in June 1962.

Career
After being commissioned, Reimer attended the Field Artillery Officer Orientation Course at Fort Sill. He served as assistant executive officer and executive officer, 20th Artillery, 5th Infantry Division (Mechanized) from 1963 to 1964. He was promoted to temporary first lieutenant in December 1963, followed by an assignment as assistant battalion adviser, Advisory Team 60, Military Assistance Command, Vietnam from 1964 to 1965.

Reimer was promoted to permanent first lieutenant in June 1965 and temporary captain in November 1965. He then returned to the United States to attend the Artillery Officer Advanced Course at Fort Sill and Fort Bliss from 1965 to 1966. Reimer next commanded Company C, 11th Battalion, 3rd Brigade, United States Army Training Center, Fort Benning, Georgia from 1966 to 1967. His next assignment was aide-de-camp to the commandant, Armed Forces Staff College, Norfolk, Virginia, 1967–1968.

Reimer was promoted to temporary major in September 1968 and permanent captain in June 1969. He served as executive officer and S–3, 2nd Battalion, 4th Artillery, 9th Infantry Division, United States Army Vietnam from 1968 to 1970 and as an instructor at the United States Army Field Artillery School at Fort Sill in 1970. Reimer attended the Command and General Staff College from 1970 to 1971, followed by an assignment as personnel management officer, Assignment Section, Field Artillery Branch, Office of Personnel Operations in Washington, D.C.

Reimer's next duty was as assistant executive officer and aide to the Chief of Staff of the Army, General Creighton W. Abrams Jr., from 1972 to 1974. He served as executive officer and S–3 (Operations and Training), Division Artillery, 4th Infantry Division (Mechanized), Fort Carson, from 1975 to 1976. During this time he was promoted to temporary lieutenant colonel and permanent major in June 1975 and June 1976, respectively. He commanded the 1st Battalion, 27th Field Artillery Regiment, 4th Infantry Division (Mechanized) at Fort Carson, Colorado from 1976 to 1978, followed by assignment as commandant, Training Command, 4th Infantry Division (Mechanized).

Reimer attended the United States Army War College from 1978 to 1979, and received his Master of Arts degree from Shippensburg State College in 1979. He was promoted to temporary colonel in August 1979 and served as deputy commander and later special assistant to the commander, V Corps Artillery, United States Army, Europe, from 1979 to 1980. Reimer was chosen to command Division Artillery, 8th Infantry Division (Mechanized) from 1980 to 1982 and was promoted to permanent colonel in March 1982. He moved on to become the division's chief of staff from 1982 to 1983.

Reimer returned to Fort Sill as deputy assistant commandant, Field Artillery Center and School from 1983 to 1984. He was promoted to permanent brigadier general in September 1984 and took up assignment as commanding general, III Corps Artillery, Fort Sill, from 1984 to 1986. He served as chief of staff, United States Army Element, Combined Field Army in the Republic of Korea in 1986, followed by assistant chief of staff, C3/J3, Republic of Korea/United States Combined Forces Command from 1986 to 1988. He received promotion to major general in September 1987 and commanded the 4th Infantry Division (Mechanized) at Fort Carson from 1988 to 1990.

This was followed by promotion to permanent lieutenant general in July 1990 and assignment as deputy chief of staff for operations and plans and Army senior member, Military Staff Committee, United Nations, Washington, D.C., from 1990 to 1991. Reimer received his fourth star in June 1991, serving as Vice Chief of Staff of the United States Army from 1991 to 1993. He then served as commanding general, United States Army Forces Command, Fort McPherson, from 1993 to 1995 before being selected as Chief of Staff of the United States Army.

Reimer has been credited with revamping the Army during a period of high-tempo deployments, including peacekeeping in Bosnia-Herzegovina and Kosovo. Reimer retired from active service in August 1999. The United States Army has named their digital library after him.

Post-retirement / Honors
After retirement, Reimer served as director of the Oklahoma City National Memorial Institute for the Prevention of Terrorism, testifying before the Congressional Subcommittee on National Security, Emergency Threats and International Relations on April 29, 2003. He has also served on the boards of Microvision, DRS Technologies, Plato Learning and Mutual of America Life Insurance. He wrote the foreword to Thomas P. Odom's 2005 book Journey Into Darkness: Genocide In Rwanda.

Reimer is on the Board of Directors for the Arlington, Virginia-based consulting firm Detica, formerly DeticaDFI and DFI International. He is also serving as the Chairman of the Board for VirtualAgility, Inc. (VA), a software development firm that provides browser-based environments that support interoperation among disparate groups and organizations. VA systems resolve several of the most urgent challenges currently facing emergency, disaster and business continuity planners. He is currently the President of Army Emergency Relief

In 1997, Reimer was inducted into the "Oklahoma Hall of Fame".  Country Music Star Vince Gill was also among five others inducted with Reimer. Oklahoma Hall of Fame

In 1999, Reimer was among the first six inductees to the "Oklahoma Military Hall of Fame". Oklahoma Military Hall of Fame

In 2011, Reimer received the "Distinguished Graduate Award" from the United States Military Academy at West Point. USMA Distinguished Graduate Award

The General Dennis J. Reimer Training and Doctrine Digital Library is an electronic "library without walls". The Library is the single repository of approved Army training and doctrine information. The Army Doctrine and Training Digital Library (ADTDL) is a U.S. Army Training and Doctrine Command (TRADOC) Information Management Support Council (IMSC) sanctioned project. It is the official repository of approved Army doctrine and, as described in TRADOC Regulation 350-70.  This Library has been dedicated to General Dennis J. Reimer.

Reimer was honored on November 22, 2018, by the Thayer Hotel in West Point and had room number 538 dedicated in his honor. Among the speakers at the event included Lieutenant General Robert F. Foley, and Major General John G. Meyer. Some of the other notable recipients of room dedications are Colonel Buzz Aldrin (class of 1951), NASA Apollo 11 Eagle Pilot and second man to walk on the moon; James V. Kimsey (class of 1962), founder of America Online; and Lieutenant General Robert F. Foley (class of 1963), who is a Medal of Honor recipient.

Reimer is married to Mary Jo (Powers) Reimer of Fargo, North Dakota. They have two children and four grandchildren.

Awards and decorations
Reimer is a recipient of the Defense Distinguished Service Medal, Army Distinguished Service Medal, two Legions of Merit, Distinguished Flying Cross, six awards of the Bronze Star Medal (one with "V" Device for valor), Purple Heart, Combat Infantryman Badge, Parachutist Badge, Aircraft Crewman Badge, and Ranger tab.

Other awards

References

Bibliography

Further reading

External links
Biography
Dennis J. Reimer Papers (While VCSA and CSA) US Army Heritage and Education Center, Carlisle, Pennsylvania

|-

1939 births
Living people
United States Army Chiefs of Staff
Recipients of the Distinguished Service Medal (US Army)
Recipients of the Legion of Merit
Recipients of the Distinguished Flying Cross (United States)
United States Army personnel of the Vietnam War
United States Army Vice Chiefs of Staff
United States Army Command and General Staff College alumni
United States Army War College alumni
Recipients of the Defense Distinguished Service Medal
Recipients of the Order of Military Merit (Brazil)
People from Medford, Oklahoma
Military personnel from Enid, Oklahoma